Rabindra Narain Singh is an Indian physician who is serving as International President of Vishva Hindu Parishad. In 2010, he got Padma Shri in Medicine. He is Member of Managing Committee of Indian Red Cross Society of Bihar.

References 

Recipients of the Padma Shri in medicine
Year of birth missing (living people)
Indian orthopedic surgeons
Indian medical administrators
Scientists from Patna
20th-century Indian medical doctors
Medical doctors from Bihar
Living people
20th-century surgeons
Vishva Hindu Parishad members
President of Vishva Hindu Parishad